Mikhail Elgin was the defending champion, but he was eliminated by his compatriot Valery Rudnev in the second round.
Dustin Brown defeated Jonathan Dasnières de Veigy 7–6(3), 6–3 in the final.

Seeds

Draw

Final four

Top half

Bottom half

References
 Main Draw
 Qualifying Draw

2009 ATP Challenger Tour
2009 Singles